The Lausanne Underground Film and Music Festival (LUFF) is a film festival and music festival devoted to underground film and music. It is held each year in Lausanne, Switzerland. The festival is organized by a non-profit organization (APCI – Association pour la Promotion de la Culture Indépendante). The organization's goals are to promote independent artistic projects and creations and to make those projects accessible to a large public. The primary goal of the Lausanne Underground Film & Music Festival is to present films and music that largely exist outside the mainstream and profit driven production and distribution circuits. The cinematic section presents mainly films with an experimental character and/or films that challenge the spectator's viewing habits. Films are screened during the day and evening, followed by live music events featuring underground artists at night. Money prizes are awarded by the festival for the films selected in the international competition, in order to support the filmmakers in creating their art. The musical program of the festival proposes sonar experimentations of all kind.

During the four concert nights of the festival week, an average of twenty international and Swiss musicians and groups play in the Salle des Fêtes of the Casino de Montbenon, the neuralgic center of the festival. In 2012 the festival has considerably enlarged its "off" program (a wide artistic offer free of charge, evolving in parallel to the official program) which continues to grow ever since and participates largely to the festive and open character of the event.During the five days of the festival, its activities also expand to local venues such as the rock club Le Romandie, the independent movie theater Le Zinéma, the cultural venue La Datcha, the auditorium of the local music school EJMA as well as the book store and art gallery La Librairie Humus, the art gallery Standard Deluxe, the associative photo&cine laboratory "on fait du l'art !", the independent movie theater Bellevaux and use to work with the café-théâtre le Bourg and the center for contemporary art Arsenic.The annual budget of the festival is of total value about 300.000 Swiss francs (270,000 euros).

History of the festival 
Originally called Underground Nights, the festival drew its inspiration from the New York Underground Film Festival. Through its initial, formative years, though, the LUFF developed its own unique program. Starting in its first year with a small screening room that could seat only 30 people, the festival managed to gather more than 1,000 spectators in 2000. In 2002, after a one-year hiatus, the festival moved to Lausanne with the support of the Swiss Film Archive, for the first official edition of the Lausanne Underground Film and Music Festival, drawing 4,000 spectators. By 2013, the festival has drawn around 8000 spectators. By programming an international short and feature films competition while still paying homage to great names of the underground like Nick Zedd, John Waters, Lloyd Kaufman, Ian Kerkhof, Kenneth Anger, Jai Love and the Kuchar brothers; and by organizing musical events featuring such artists as Jimi Tenor, Hanin Elias, Techno Animal, Chicks on Speed, Rhys Chatam, Pansonic and Alan Vega, the LUFF programming now stretches beyond the Swiss borders.

Festival Editions

2016: The Fifteenth Edition 
Will be held from October 19 to 23 2016 in Lausanne.

2015: The Fourteenth Edition 
Held from October 14 to 18 2015, it has attracted around 13'000 spectators during the five days of film screenings and four concert nights. Among the retrospective programs one dedicated to filmmaker Jeff Perkins presented his Movies for the Blind, a series of intensive recordings of interviews with passengers in his yellow cab from 1995 to 2002.

Film Awards 2015 
 2015 - Best Feature Film: Felt by de Jason Banker
 2015 - Best Short Fiction Film: Notre dame des hormones by Bertrand Mandico
 2015 - Best Experimental Short Film: Rearranged by Ewa Górzna
 2015 - Best Short Animation: Pandemonio by Valerio Spinelli
 2015 - Best Short Documentary: Then Then Then by Daniel Shioler

Music line-up 2015

Wednesday 
 Ecoute la merde
 Jacob Kirkegaard plays Else Marie Pade,
 Anti-Ensemble: Imperial Dissolution
 Liturgy
 Jim Haynes

Thursday 
 Nicolas Collins
 C. Spencer Yeh
 Marcus Schmickler
 Pedestrian Deposit
 Mei Zhiyong
 Denis Rollet

Friday 
 Neutral
 Katsura Mouri
 Menace Ruine
 Sissy Spacek
 Lumisokea

Saturday  
 e:ch feat. JinniL
 Sin:Ned feat. Laurent Valdès
 Maria Chavez
 Headwar
 Extreme Precautions
 Sly & The Family Drone

2014: The Thirteenth Edition 
Was held from 15 to 19 October 2015.

Film Awards 2014 
 2014 – Best Feature Film: Buzzard by Joel Potrykus, 2014, USA
 2014 – Best Short Fiction Film (ex aequo): The Voice Thief by Adan Jodorowski, 2013, CHI, FRA, USA.
 2014 – Best Short Fiction Film (ex aequo): Straight to Video by Elizabeth Vazquez, 2013, USA
 2014 – Best Experimental Short Film: Kudryavka Little Ball of Fur by Pikku Kippura, 2013, FIN
 2014 – Best Short Animation: Wawd Ahp, Stephen Girard, 2013, USA

Music line-up 2014

Wednesday 
 Morton Subotnick
 Gordon Monahan: "Speaker Swinging"
 Keith Fullerton Whitman & Mark Fell
 Cédric Dambrain

Thursday 
 Bryan Lewis Saunders & John Duncan
 Tetsuo Furudate
 Aaron Dilloway
 Robert Curgenven
 Les Belles Noiseuses

Friday 
 Dalglish
 Winter Family
 Mohammad
 Cadaver Eyes
 G*Park

Saturday 
 Mario de Vega
 Cobra
 Dustbreeders & Junko
 Black Zenith
 Kuro Pipe

2013: The Twelfth Edition 
The twelfth edition of the festival (October 16 to 20 2013) featured a total of 98 films. Retrospective programs featured works by Japanese surrealist filmmaker Katsu Kanai, French actor-filmmaker Pierre Clémenti, French punk author, musician and filmmaker , Russian independent filmmaker , Polish filmmaker Walerian Borowczyk and Belgian filmmaker Marcel Broodthaers as well as a carte blanche program to Jello Biafra. The international film competition included five feature films and 18 short films. The music part included 24 concerts for the total of four concert nights. The program presented sets by artists such as Emptyset, Endon, The Haxan Cloak, Vomir, Kracoon, Sugar Craft, Sajjanu, Jello Biafra, Fen (Far East Network: Otomo Yoshihide, Ryu Hankil, Yuen Chee Wal, Yan Jun), Nate Young, Blackphone666, Aluk Todolo, Jason Lescalleet, JG Thirwell, Bryan Lewis Saunders, Leif Elggren, Jean-François Laporte, Evil Moisture, Smegma, Nicolas Bernier & Martin Messier, Kiko C. Esseiva and DJ Nozinja. A total of 58 artists (musicians and filmmakers) were present during the five days of the festival to present their works.

The twelfth edition of the Lausanne Underground Film & Music Festival also proposed a range of workshops, aiming to introduce spectators to new or little known artistic techniques. The five workshops were held by artists such as the South-African group Shangaan Dance, Japanese decoupage artist Kosuke Kawamura, Canadian experimental musician Jean-François Laporte, Japanese noise musician Endon and French musician and artist Andy Bolus.

The program of the festival also included an off part featuring the festival's own radio station (LUFF.FM), expositions and various artistic performances all through the five days of the festival.

Film Awards 2013 

 2013 – Best Feature Film: Worm by Andrew Bowser
 2013 – Best Short Fiction Film: Fist of Jesus by David Munoz
 2013 – Best Experimental Short Film: Autoportrait: Presto con Amore by Martin Messier

Music line-up 2013

Wednesday 
 Nozinja
 Jean-François Laporte "Rust"
 Kiko C. Esseiva
 Nicolas Bernier & Martin Messier "la chambre des machines"
 Smegma & Kosuke Kawamura
 Evil Moisture
 Jean-François Laporte "Mantra"

Thursday 
 Leif Elggren
 Bryan Lewis Saunders
 JG Thirlwell (Foetus):"Cholera Nocebo"
 Jason Lescalleet
 Aluk Todolo
 Blackphone666

Friday 
 Nate Young
 FEN
 Jello Biafra & Ravi Shardja & Anton Mobin
 Sajjanu
 Sugarcraft

Saturday 
 Vomir
 The Haxan Cloak
 ENDON
 Emptyset

2012: The Eleventh Edition 

For the eleventh edition of the festival (October 17–21, 2012) John Waters was invited to present his one Man show "This Filthy World", a vaudeville act that celebrates his film career and obsessional tastes, and to present a retrospective of four of his early films as well as a selection of four of his favorite films. Other retrospectives included works by Austrian filmmaker and writer Christoph Schlingensief, Richard Stanley and Dutch provocateur Edwin Brienen. The international competition included five feature films and 28 short films. 21 musical performances were held during the four concert nights, featuring artists such as Pain Jerk, Brutal Truth, Fat32, rm, Blectum From Blechdom, Kim Gordon, Bill Nace, Maja S. K. Ratkje, Ikue Mori, Greg Pope, Gilles Aubry, Radian, Cellule d'Intervention Metamkine, Kevin Drumm, Thomas Ankersmit, Michael Esposito, Mattin, Zeni Geva, Arcangel Constantini, Yan Jun.

Film Awards 2012 

 2012 - Best Feature Film: Toad Road by Jason Banker
 2012 - Best Short Fiction Film: Boro in the Box by Bertrand Mandico
 2012 - Best Short Animation: Bobby Yeah by Robert Morgan
 2012 - Best Short Experimental: Six Hundred and Forty-one Slates by Don Swaynos

Music line-up 2012

Wednesday 
 Yan Jun
 Arcangel Constantini
 Zeni Geva
 MATTIN
 Michael Esposito

Thursday 
 Thomas Ankersmit
 Kevin Drumm
 Cellule d'intervention Metamkine
 Radian, Marzouk & Barrier & Degouts
 Gilles Aubry

Friday 
 Greg Pope: "light trap"
 Maja S. K. Ratkje & Ikue Mori
 Body/Head: Kim Gordon & Bill Nace
 Blectum From Blechdom
 rm

Saturday 
 FAT32
 Oi Polloi (censored by the authorities of the city of Lausanne)
 Brutal Truth plays Robert Pietrowicz
 Pain Jerk

2012: LUFF does TOKYO / FEEDBACK TOKYO 
At the occasion of the tenth edition, the festival held a special anniversary edition in Tokyo, Japan through an exchange program line-up between the festival, the livehouse Super-Deluxe (Tokyo) and the team of dEnOISE events, Uplink Factory and Image Forum Festival. This one time only exchange was held from April 27 to May 4, 2012 and featured movies from Peter Liechti, Emmanuelle de Riedmatten, Stephan E. Hauser among many others. A website in Japanese, English and French was made for the occasion : http://tokyo.luff.ch.

Music line-up

27 April 2012 @ UPLINK 
 CINE-NOISE
 Sachiko M plays on the movie The Magic of Decay... Decay of the Magic by Stefan E. Hauser

28 April 2012 @ Super-Deluxe (dEnOISE 4) 
 [sic]
 Schimpfluch-Gruppe
 OFFSEASON & Yudayajazz
 Takashi Nemoto VS Kosuke Kawamura
 Kleptomaniac + Atsuhiro Ito
 Kuruucrew feat. Hair Stylistics
 Pain Jerk feat. Taichi Nagura
 Zbigniew Karkowski feat. Daniel Buess

29 April 2012 @ Super-Deluxe (dEnOISE 5) 
 Jim O'Rourke feat. Norber Möslang
 ASTRO & Dave Phillips
 Francisco Meirino
 d'Incise
 CARRE feat. Strotter Inst.
 Kiko C. Esseiva
 Hijokaidan feat. HIKO
 MARUOSA vs Syndrome WPW
 DJ Marc Robert

2011: The Tenth Edition 
The tenth edition of the festival was held from October 19 to 23 2011.

Film Awards 2011 
 2011 - Best Short Feature Length Film: The Oregonian by Calvin Reeder
 2011 - Best Short Animation: Miss Candace Hilligoss’ Flickering Halo by Fabio Scacchioli & Vincenzo Core
 2011 - Best Short Experimental: Slick Horsing by Kiron Hussain

Music line-up 2011

Spécial opening @ Les DOCKS 
 Diamanda Galas (organized with Les DOCKS as opening night the week-end before the festival.)

Wednesday 
 David Dunn
 Nurse With Wound
 Z'ev
 ART ERROR IST

Thursday 
 Dragos Tara – PIXEL
 Insub Meta Orchestra & Kasper T. Toeplitz – _INSUB_
 Chop Shop – OXIDE
 Rudolf Eb.er
 Hair Stylistics
 Kasper T. Toeplitz

Friday 
 Diversion I: Gudrun Gut, Jou, Pierre Audétat, Bacalao
 Thiaz Itch
 Kuruucrew
 Maruosa

Saturday 
 Pivixki + Marco Fusinato
 Alva Noto
 Byetone
 Broken Note

2010: The Ninth Edition 
The tenth edition of the festival was held from October 20 to 24 2010.

Film Awards 2010 
 2010 - Best Short Fiction Film: You're the Stranger Here by Tom Geens
 2010 - Best Short Animation: Oranus by Jelena Girlin and Mari-Liis Bassovskaja
 2010 - Best Short Experimental: M by Felix Dufour-Laperriere

Music line-up 2010

Wednesday 
 Michael Gendreau
 Valerio Tricoli
 The sons of god
 Carl-Michael von Hausswolff
 Robert Piotrowicz

Thursday 
 Monster War
 Gerritt Wittmer
 Ramleh
 Hijokaidan
 Evol
 Tujiko Noriko + Lawrence English + John Chantler (@ Le Bourg)

Friday 
 Gu Guai Xing Qiu
 Discharge
 Incapacitants
 Les Trucs
 GTUK

Saturday 
 Fennesz
 Oneohtrix Point Never
 Starkey
 Enduser + Nicolas Chevreux
 Cindy Talk, Bruce Gilbert (@ Le Bourg)
 rm (@ Le Bourg)

2009: The Eighth Edition 
This edition was held from October 14 to 18 2009

Music line-up 2009

Wednesday 
 Chikanari Shukuka
 The Haters
 Damion Romero
 Michael Gendreau
 rm

Thursday 
 Oren Ambarchi & Robbie Avenaim
 Tony Conrad & Keiji Haino
 Sister Iodine
 Norbert Möslang
 rm

Friday 
 Kania Tieffer
 Ben Et Béné
 Planningtorock
 OFFSEASON
 Jankenpopp
 Unas

Saturday 
 Solid Black Night
 Sunn O
 Scorn
 Jamie Vex'd
 King Cannibal

2008: The Seventh Edition 
Held from October 15 to 19 2008.

Music line-up 2008

Wednesday 
 Zeek Sheck
 MoHa !
 Joe Colley
 Skullflower
 Deathroes
 Tralphaz

Thursday 
 Ilios
 Sum or R
 Haswell & Hecker
 Corrupted with Tsurisaki Kiyotaka
 Dave Phillips

Friday 
 Daniel Buess & Zbigniew Karkowksi
 Charlemagne Palestine
 Karl Lemieux Project
 Jackie O'Motherfucker
 DJ Elephant Power

Saturday 
 Opérateur Fotokopieur
 Jean-Jacques Perrey & David Chazam
 Radioactive Man
 Tara Delong
 DJ Scotch Egg (canceled)
 Eat Rabbit

2007: The Sixth Edition 
Held from October 10 to 14 in Swiss Film Archive, Arsenic and Zinéma.

Music line-up 2007

Wednesday 
 Dorit Chrysler & Gibby Haynes
 Borbetomagus
 Lydia Luch & Les Aus
 No Bra

Thursday 
 Jazkamer
 Astro + Reiko A. + PHROQ
 The Skull Defekts
 Antimatter & Zbigniew Karkowksi

Friday 
 Fuckhead
 Skindrone
 Gert-Jan Prins
 Kap Bambino
 Sang Bleu

Saturday 
 Ghislain Poirier
 Sixtoo
 Milanese
 Cursor Miner
 [sic]

2006: The Fifth Edition 
The fifth edition of LUFF (October 11–15, 2006) featured a look at Viennese Actionism, a retrospective on Jonas Mekas, a program titled sXprmntl selected by Roland Lethem with films by Thierry Zéno, Philippe Caufriez, Patrice Bauduinet, and Patrick Hella, as well as a series by Jean-Jacques Rousseau. Musical events included Genesis P-Orridge, Lydia Lunch, John Duncan, The Haters, Gabi Delgado, Kid 606, Spectre, and more.

Film Awards 2006 
 2006 - Best Feature: Threat by Matt Pizzolo and Katie Nisa
 2006 - Best Short Film: Memory Lapse by Scott Amos
 2006 - Best Experimental Film: Emerge (film) by Stephane Broc

Music line-up 2006

Wednesday 
 Thee Majety
 Neue Weltumfassende Resistance
 Lydia Lunch: real pornography
 Antoine Chessex

Thursday 
 The Haters
 John Duncan
 S.S.S. with Atau Tanaka
 Randy H.Y. Yau
 Scott Arford
 Infrasound
 Column One
 The MERJ Experience presents MATIERE

Friday 
 Felix Kubin and Pia Burnette
 Superalisa
 Quintron & Miss Pussycat
 Kissogram
 Egotronic
 Live video by la SUPERMAFIA

Saturday 
 KID 606
 DJ Rupture + Filastine
 Shadow Huntaz
 Sensational + Kouheikoyxen + Spectre
 Hidden_K

2005: The Fourth Edition 
October 12 to 16 2005

Film Awards 2005 

 2005 - Best Feature:  Die You Zombie bastards ! by Caleb Emerson
 2005 - Best Short Film: Clean by Geoffrey Engelbrecht
 2005 - Best Experimental Film: Grau by Robert Seidl  and  Fiddler's Green by Jean-Claude Campell and Marco Bowald

Music line-up 2005

Wednesday 
 Masonna
 Zbigniew Karkowski + Atsuko Nojiri
 Daniel Menche
 Dear Daniel & Michael...
 Dave Phillips
 Sudden Infant
 Justice Yeldham & the Dynamic Ribbon Device
 G*Park

Thursday 
 Francisco Meirino
 Francisco Lopez
 Pita & Jade
 Vladislav Delay
 Mystery Frequency

Friday 
 The Licks
 Etant Donnés
 Alan Vega
 Melt-Banana
 James d'O

Saturday 
 Jo la Noize
 Syndrome WPW
 Special Event: A*Class (Gina V. D'Orio vs Patric Catani, ex EC8OR)
 DAT Politics
 Candie Hank aka Patric Catani
 Deknoid

2004: The Third Edition 
October 13 to 17 2004

Music line-up 2004

Wednesday 
 Dolores Dewberry
 Jean-Louis Costes Show
 Tujiko Noriko
 Whitehouse
 PHROQ

Thursday 
 Les poissons autistes
 Pan Sonic
 Merzbow
 Hecate

Friday 
 Disco Doom
 Rhys Chatham project
 Tempsion
 DJ's ZOB + ESC

Saturday 
 Surprise Tricycle Evolutif: Wild Guy
 Mignon
 Jacqui & Flow
 Chicks on Speed

2003 : The Second Edition 
October 8 to 12 2003

Music line-up 2003

Wednesday 
 Reverse Engineering
 Techno Animal
 Asifuoxyd
 DJ ZOB + ESC

Thursday 
 Kunst
 Fatal: Hanin Elias+C.H.I.F.F.R.E.+Philipp Virus
 DJ Lincé

Friday 
 Performance cinématographique
 Monno
 Dermehr Gauner

Saturday 
 Digitaline
 Mouse on Mars
 DJ Sonja Moonear

2002: The First Edition 
The first edition of the festival was held from June 5 to 9 2002.

Music line-up 2002

Wednesday 
 Jimi Tenor

Thursday 
 "Plug me in" music by Add N To (x)
 Nimby
 Hexstatic
 Lektrogirl
 DJ Jobot

Friday 
 Otaslogi.c
 Scanner
 Kippu

Saturday 
 The Never Evers
 One Dimensional Man
 DJ Lars

See also 
 New York Underground Film Festival
  Category:Festival de cinéma en Suisse
  Category:Cinéma expérimental
  Category:Film underground
  Category:Lausanne

External links 
 Lausanne Underground Film and Music Festival, official site

References 

Experimental film festivals
Film festivals in Switzerland
Underground film festivals
Music festivals in Switzerland
Film festivals established in 2002
Autumn events in Switzerland